Harry Hall (c. 1814 – 22 April 1882) was an English equestrian painter, whose works were in demand by horse owners. His output was prolific and he was the foremost racehorse portraitist of his time: his style has been described as being "strikingly modern... when compared with many of his contemporaries". He also produced other types of portraits and shooting scenes.

Career
Hall was born in Cambridge sometime around the middle of the second decade of the 19th century (dates of 1813, 1814, 1815, and 1816 are to be found in biographies).

He first appeared as an artist at Tattersalls, working on a number of their publications; initially British Racehorses and The Sporting Review. He graduated to become chief artist of The Field. He produced a great volume of work, much of which was engraved. The Sporting Magazine published 114 plates by Hall. He also worked for The Illustrated London News.

Hall began life as a portrait painter, and exhibited at the Royal Academy from 1838, however his career was established on his first equestrian work being given at the Royal Academy in 1845 when he exhibited a Suffolk cob from Newmarket.

He worked out of his home, Willoughby House, Newmarket from 1846, and frequently across England and Europe. He worked continuously with no need for exhibiting from 1860.

Death
Having lately returned from a long commission in Chantilly, France, he returned home to Willoughby House, Newmarket and died there of paralysis.

See also
Horses in art

References

External links
 
A detailed Biography of Henry Hall with images of his work
A shorter biography of Hall, with additional details
A gallery of paintings by Henry Hall available as prints
Two large images of paintings by Hall
Artcyclopedia (a listing of art galleries around the world known to possess paintings by Henry Hall)

1810s births
1882 deaths
Equine artists
19th-century British painters